Athanasios Stoikos (born 28 January 1988) is a retired Greek footballer.

Career
Born in Serres, Stoikos made his professional debut for Panthrakikos in the Greek Super League. After a knee injury he was forced to retire at the age of 28 in 2016.

Personal life 

He hails from Agio Pnevma, Serres.

References

External links

 Guardian Football
Profile at EPAE.org
Profile at Onsports.gr

1988 births
Living people
Greek footballers
Panthrakikos F.C. players
Iraklis Thessaloniki F.C. players
Fokikos A.C. players
Ethnikos Sidirokastro F.C. players
Association football midfielders
Footballers from Serres